In mathematics, a subbundle  of a vector bundle  on a topological space  is a collection of linear subspaces of the fibers  of  at  in  that make up a vector bundle in their own right.

In connection with foliation theory, a subbundle of the tangent bundle of a smooth manifold may be called a distribution (of tangent vectors). 

If a set of vector fields  span the vector space  and all Lie commutators  are linear combinations of the  then one says that  is an involutive distribution.

See also 

 
 

Fiber bundles